Castell is a surname of Catalan origin. Notable people with the surname include:

Adela Castell (1864–1926), Uruguayan educator, writer and poet
Alan Castell (born 1943), English cricketer
David Castell, American record producer, musician and recording engineer
Edmund Castell (1606–1685), English orientalist
John Castell (aka John Castle), 15th-century Master of University College, Oxford and a Chancellor of the University
Lacksley Castell (1962–1984), Jamaican reggae singer
Patricia Castell (1926–2013), Argentine actress
Sir William Castell (born 1947), British businessman

Catalan-language surnames
Surnames of Welsh origin